The Free Syrian University was established in 2013 to address the increasing amount of college aged refugees who lack education as a result of the ongoing Syrian Uprising. The university is of secular orientation and not affiliated with any particular faith, although it does contain a College of Sharia, providing undergraduate degrees in Sunni Islamic Law. The university does strongly support the Syrian Revolution, "with both its name and its mandate from the Free Syrian Legal Authority, a type of clearinghouse organization that proves the organization functions with the blessing of the Free Syrian Army— [which] is directly connected to the armed resistance against the Assad regime."

The university's mission statement is “to prepare educated generations who seek to build a country of law and justice and institutions.”

History
The university's founder, Musab Al-Jamal, was a former law professor from Damascus University, Syria. He joined other faculty who were driven out from the war torn country to lecture students in liberated regions in the nation and neighboring countries. In 2012, Al-Jamal, along with several former classmates who attended Damascus University in the 1970s, fled for Turkey when the initially peaceful uprising descended into violence. It was then that Al-Jamal and his former classmates thought of establishing the Free Syrian University.

Campus
Offering a mix of both on-campus and online teaching, the campus is located in an apartment building in Reyhanli, a Turkish town near the Syrian border. Since much of the refugee population, including both students and faculty, still remains in Syria, the university offers lessons via Skype, Facebook and email. This is part of what the founder terms an "open-learning" approach.

Organization and administration

Governance
The university has found support from professors among the Syrian diaspora living in Europe, who have offered to teach classes in Turkey and from abroad through the Internet. In total there are 32 professors in Reyhanli, and more than 60 throughout the world, all Syrian nationals.

The university's curriculum is “a combination of the old regime curriculum and new information from Sweden and Germany in particular." It also includes English courses each semester.

Finances
The university is mainly funded by its founder and a host of academic volunteers donating their time and expertise to the cause. The founder gives them a one-time payment of $1,500 when they sign up. A modest fee structure is in place with students inside Syria charged $280 per semester and those outside $560. More than 90 percent of students are unable to pay anything and attend classes for free.

Academics
The university is organized into ten separate academic units (colleges) with the only campus in Reyhanli. The following colleges are:
College of Media
College of Law
College of International Relations and Diplomacy
College of Engineering
College of Education
College of Islamic sharia
College of Liberal Arts
College of Middle Eastern Studies
College of Business
College of Information Technology

Enrollment
The Free Syrian University has formally enrolled 870 students in Turkey and has hundreds more on digital mailing lists inside Syria and other neighboring countries, mostly in Jordan.

References

External links

Educational institutions established in 2013
Private universities and colleges in Turkey
Refugees of the Syrian civil war
2013 establishments in Turkey